Pickering Beach is a neighbourhood in the Ajax town of Ontario, Canada. Located on Lake Ontario east of Toronto, it was once an important cottage destination for Toronto's upper class.

In 1926, Toronto lawyer James Tuckett bought lakeshore farmland in the Pickering Township to develop a seasonal cottage community that eventually evolved into a permanently settled unincorporated community. The local residents formed an Association that organized events; raised funds for road maintenance and flood prevention; established a church, a school, and a park; operated a fire station as volunteers; and lobbied for municipal services such as electricity, garbage collection, and sewage.

In the early 1970s, MTRCA acquired several lake front properties for a parkland. In 1974, Pickering Beach merged with the town of Ajax, within the Regional Municipality of Durham. Modern residences have now replaced the original cottages. The local beach is now called Paradise Beach, although the neighbourhood retains its original name.

History 

In 1926, James Tuckett, a young lawyer from Toronto, visited the beach along Lake Ontario in the south-east part of the Pickering Township (the beach is now called Paradise Beach, and is located in the town of Ajax). He sensed a business opportunity to build a cottage community, and bought the lakeshore farmland between a natural marshland in the west and Carruthers Creek in the east. He built several cabins for sale or rent, and left some empty lots for buyers to build cottages. In his promotional literature, Tuckett described the Pickering Beach as "the ideal summer resort". The community became a popular weekend destination among the residents of Toronto. Beach sports, other outdoor activities, and dancing in the local Pavillion became popular activities for the visitors and the resident cottagers.

Community Association 

At the time of the community's establishment, the Powell Road (later Pickering Beach Road), the main path leading to the beach, was a dirt road. In the 1930s, Stanley Mann, a realtor hired by Tuckett, helped the local residents form the Pickering Beach Community Associ­ation to address issues such as poor condition of roads and flooding. The Association consulted with Tuckett, and came up with a plan to raise funds for improving the poor condition of the gravel roads leading to the Beach. The vendors at the Beach were now required to pay a license fee (up to a maximum of $15 per season); the collected amount would go towards the road maintenance. The number of vendors was restricted to two of each type; e.g. only two bakery wagons were allowed on the beach at a time.

In 1937, the Association formalized its constitution and elected officers. It had a nominal membership fee ($1 for residents, 25 cents for visitors), which paid for police presence during the events organized at the beach, among other things. The Association held monthly meetings at various cottages in rotation, and at rented spaces in Toronto during winter. It also organized various events such as races, tug-o-war contests, softball games, bingo games, and Christmas Euchres.

By 1935, electricity supply had reached the lakefront cottages and farmers through power lines. By 1938, the Association had 150 members. It lobbied for lower electricity rates, and negotiated weekly garbage collection from the cottages for a fee of $3 per season.

In 1940, the Association, with contribution from Stanley Mann, built the Marquee Dance Pavilion at Pickering Beach. Mann also led a campaign by the cottagers to develop a park at the end of the Shoal Point Road, west of the Pickering Beach. The new park had a baseball field, picnic tables, and a concession stand.

During the World War II, Stanley Mann worked at Defence Industries Limited Pickering Works, located north-west of Pickering Beach. He eventually purchased all the unsold lots from James Tuckett, and encouraged his friends and acquaintances to visit the Pickering Beach.

After the end of the War in 1945, several students from the University of Toronto's Ajax campus rented the Pickering Beach cottages and winterized them. The Pickering Beach cottages now remained in use throughout the year.

The local taxpayers formed the Pickering Beach Ratepayers' Association, which lobbied for facilities such as street lights, fire station, and upgraded telephone and power lines. In the 1970s, the Ratepayers' Association was renamed to Pickering Beach Residents Association. It started a newspaper, The Beach Newsview, which covered local news, births, deaths, and family profiles. The Association organized the Strawberry Shortcake Festival every June. The festival featured shortcakes and entertainment, and the proceeds were donated to charitable causes including the Ajax and Pickering General Hospital.

Pickering Beach Community Church 

By 1945, Stanley Mann had become a fundamentalist Christian, and established a Sunday school at his home in the spring of 1945. In 1949, he founded the Pickering Beach Mission, and donated a lot at the corner of Lakeview Boulevard and Cherry Street for building a church. He started the construction of the Pickering Beach Community Church, with help and donations from other local residents, and from his friends based in Oshawa and Whitby.

The Church was dedicated on 24 June 1950, with a congregation of 160 people. Further additions were made to the church in the following year, to make it usable throughout the year. In 1956, an auditorium was added.

The Church closed after MTRCA acquired lake front properties. It held its final service on 30 December 1973, and its con­gregation voted to unite with the Baptist congregation in Ajax. A Sunday bus service was established to help the Pickering Beach residents travel to the Ajax Baptist Church.

School 

Around 1860, United Empire Loyalists had built a school on the Pickering Beach Road. Initially, the children of the Pickering Beach community attended this school, known as the "little red brick school".

As the number of students increased with rise in population, a new school building was proposed at a Pickering Township meeting. Stanley Mann donated land in the park for the proposed building, and the cost of constructing the building was covered by grants. The local Home and School Association raised the funds for equipment and other costs through bingo, euchre, plays and carnivals.

The construction of the new school - named Paradise School - began in June 1954, but the nearly-complete structure was destroyed by Hurricane Hazel on 15 October 1954. The school building opened in June 1955, and 100 students started classes there in September. Stanley Mann served as superintendent for the Pickering Beach School District during the 1950s. He died in Florida, around 1960.

Like the church, Paradise School closed in 1974, after MTRCA acquired its land for the parkland.

Fire station 

In the 1950s, there were two major house fires in the area. The Pickering Township agreed to establish the South East Pickering Fire Hall, on the condition that the local residents provided the volunteers for operating it. The fire station was initially established in the form of a garage-like structure that accommodated a trailer carrying a water pump, a fire hose and nozzles.

In 1967, a cement block building housing a fire truck replaced the garage. The volunteer firemen's wives often answered the calls, as the men had full-time jobs. The women also helped raise funds for the costs not covered by the Township, by organizing bake sales, euchre nights, and dances held at the local school.

Besides fighting fires, the fire department helped erect sandbag barriers at the lake, and participated in other community projects. In 1974, after amalgamation of Pickering Beach into the town of Ajax, the South East Pickering Fire Department became part of the Ajax Fire Department. In 1989, the South East Pickering fire station shut down, and the town's Parks and Recreation Department started using its building as storage.

MTRCA expropriation and merger with Ajax 

In the early 1970s, the Metropolitan Toronto and Region Conservation Authority (MTRCA) began acquiring property along the lake front east of Toronto. Around 20 homes, the Pickering Beach Community Church, and the Paradise School building were demolished for a parkland.

In 1974, the unincorporated community became a part of the town of Ajax. The local beach was now part of Ajax instead of the neighbouring city of Pickering, which retained the Township's name. In the late 2010s, the beach was renamed to "Paradise Beach".

Water distribution and sewage system 

In 1972, piped drinking water reached Pickering Beach, but there was no sewer system: the locals had septic systems. The Pickering Township had banned new construction in the area because of high water table. Real estate agents had misled several people into purchasing vacant lots in the area, and because of the ban, these buyers were unable to subdivide their lots or build houses on them.

In the 1980s, these buyers lobbied to the Town of Ajax as well as the Durham Region, for installation of sanitary sewers in the area. After a survey of rate payers, the local administration installed sanitary sewers (but not storm sewers) in the area.

Borders and demographics 

As a neighbourhood of Ajax, Pickering Beach is bordered by Pickering Beach Road in the west, southern part of Rollo Dr in the north, Carruthers Creek in the east, and Lake Ontario in the south. Neighbourhoods bordering it include Clover Ridge in the west, Southwood in the north, and Lakeside in the east.

According to the 2011 census of Canada, Pickering Beach had a population of 1263 residing in 403 dwellings.

Notable residents 

Among notable Canadians who were born in, lived in, or visited the beach are grocery chain founder T. P. Loblaw, wrestler 'Whipper' Billy Watson, artist Florence Helena McGillivray, and pioneering woman school board trustee Alice Charlotte Corbet.

References

Bibliography

External links 

 Boundaries of Pickering Beach shown in a map of Ajax neighbourhoods
 Ajax Public Library Digital Archive
 Aerial view of Pickering Beach and surround area, c. 1966-1970
 Minutes of Pickering Beach Home and School
 Other historical images of Pickering Beach

Neighbourhoods in Ajax, Ontario